Ďanová is a village and municipality in Martin District in the Žilina Region of northern Slovakia.

History
In historical records the village was first mentioned in 1252.

Geography
The municipality lies at an altitude of 395 metres and covers an area of 7.662 km². It has a population of about 488 people.

Sport
There's Futbal club within the village called FK Ďanová. Web homepage of the club is http://www.fkdanova.sk

Genealogical resources

The records for genealogical research are available at the state archive "Statny Archiv in Bytca, Slovakia"

 Roman Catholic church records (births/marriages/deaths): 1777-1949 (parish B)
 Lutheran church records (births/marriages/deaths): 1689-1895 (parish B)

See also
 List of municipalities and towns in Slovakia

External links
http://www.statistics.sk/mosmis/eng/run.html
Surnames of living people in Danova

Villages and municipalities in Martin District